Henrik Lehm (born 23 August 1960) is a Danish professional football  manager who currently manages the women's team of MSV Duisburg.

Coaching career
Lehm started coaching at AC Horsens as women's team coach in 1989 and managed different danish club and also worked as the youth coach and academy director. He was the manager of Denmark U17 and U19 women team from 2002 to 2008. After the national team coaching he returnts to club football in 2008 with Næsby BK. In 2012 he joined danish club Akademisk Boldklub  and he was with them until 2013. From 2013 to 2016 he worked as the youth team director of the Brøndby IF. In January 2016 he appointed as the head coach of HB Køge and he was with club for two years and he left the club in 2018.

In January 2020 he was appointed as the Ghana Premier League Club Inter allies manager, and with them he achieved Ghana premier league coach of the month award in February.

In June 2021 he was named new manager of the women's team of MSV Duisburg.

References

1960 births
Living people
Danish football managers
Næsby Boldklub managers
Vendsyssel FF managers
Akademisk Boldklub managers
HB Køge managers
Danish 1st Division managers